Arjay L. M. Smith (born November 27, 1983) is an American actor best known for his teenage role portraying the title character of the Nickelodeon children's television series The Journey of Allen Strange. Smith portrayed terrorist Laurent Dubaku during Season 7 of the FOX thriller/drama 24. Smith also portrayed Max Lewicki on the TNT television series Perception.

Career
Smith's first acting role was in the sitcom Nick Freno: Licensed Teacher, playing Jared. He portrayed Brian Parks in the film The Day After Tomorrow alongside Jake Gyllenhaal and Tanner in Vacancy 2: The First Cut. He was in the film To Save a Life as Matt McQueen. He has also appeared in television shows such as Sons of Anarchy,  NYPD Blue, Criminal Minds, Bones, Like Family, Strong Medicine, Cold Case, Without A Trace, Charmed, Masters of Horror, Step by Step, That's So Raven, Boston Public, The West Wing, The Drew Carey Show, ER, Figure It Out, Medium, The Bernie Mac Show and ‘’The Journey of Allen Strange’’. Smith had a recurring role in Malcolm in the Middle playing Cadet Ken Finley, and most recently appeared as James Murray in Season 3 of The Rookie.

Filmography

Film

TV Series

References

External links

1983 births
Living people
African-American male actors
American male child actors
American male film actors
American male television actors
Male actors from Los Angeles
21st-century African-American people
20th-century African-American people